Bambai Ki Sair also known as Holiday in Bombay is a Bollywood social comedy film. It was released in 1941 and directed by Sarvottam Badami for Sudama Productions. The music direction was by Khemchand Prakash with lyrics by D. N. Madhok, Munshi Dil, B.R. Sharma and Pandit Indra. The film starred Shobhna Samarth, Sabita Devi, E. Billimoria, Jal Merchant, Arun, Vatsala Kumtekar and Ghory.

Cast
 Shobhana Samarth
 Sabita Devi
 Arun
 Vatsala Kumtekar
 E. Bilimoria
 Jal Merchant
 Ghory

Music
The music was composed by Khemchand Prakash with lyrics written by D. N. Madhok, Munshi Dil, B.R. Sharma and Pandit Indra.

Songlist

References

External links
 

1941 films
1940s Hindi-language films
Films scored by Khemchand Prakash
Indian comedy films
Indian black-and-white films
1941 comedy films
Films directed by Sarvottam Badami
Hindi-language comedy films